Johnny Rebb, born Donald James Delbridge, (20 March 1939 – 28 July 2014) was an Australian singer.

Rebb began as a country & western singer and was signed with Leedon Records and was dubbed the "Gentleman of Rock" by disc jockeys of the time.

He also replaced Johnny O'Keefe as the MC of Saturday Rock while O'Keefe was in the USA. In the 1960s, with the onslaught of rock'n'roll, Rebb began singing in the band The Atlantics and became their lead singer.

Singles
"Johnny B. Goode" / "Rebel Rock" - Columbia, 1958
"Think Me A Kiss" /"Love Ville" - Coronet, 1960
"Lonesome Road" / "We Belong Together" - Leedon, 1960
"Hey Sheriff" / "Noeline" - Leedon,  1959
"How Will It End" /"There You Go" - Coronet, 1960
"Anytime You Want Me" / "She's Just Another Girl" - Coronet, 1961
"Billy Blue Shoes" / "Letter A Day" - London, 1962
"Got Over It" / "Secret" - CBS, 1963

References

Further reading
Sydney Morning Herald obituary

Australian rock singers
1939 births
2014 deaths
20th-century Australian musicians